A box or tubular girder is a girder that forms an enclosed tube with multiple walls, as opposed to an - or -beam. Originally constructed of riveted wrought iron, they are now made of rolled or welded steel, aluminium extrusions or prestressed concrete.

Compared to an -beam, the advantage of a box girder is that it better resists torsion.

The distinction in naming between a box girder and a tubular girder is imprecise. Generally the term box girder is used, especially if it is rectangular in section. Where the girder carries its "content" inside the box, such as the Britannia Bridge, it is termed a tubular girder. Tubular girder is also used if the girder is round or oval in cross-section, such as the Royal Albert Bridge.

Where a large box girder contains more than two walls, i.e. with multiple boxes, it is referred to as a cellular girder.

Development 
The theoretical basis of the box girder was largely the work of the engineer Sir William Fairbairn, with the aid of the mathematician Eaton Hodgkinson, around 1830. They sought to design for the most efficient beam possible in the new material of riveted wrought iron plates.

Cellular construction 
Most girders are statically loaded such that one web is in compression, the other in tension. Fairbairn's original cranes used a cellular construction for the compression face for their jib, so as to resist buckling. This jib was curved, tapered and formed of riveted wrought iron plates. Three cells were formed inside the concave (lower) face of this girder, again of riveted plates.

Where a tubular girder is used as a bridge span (i.e. loaded in the centre rather than at one end, like a crane) the compressive force is in the top web of the girder and so the cells are placed at the top. Dynamic forces (moving loads, wind) may also require both faces to be cellular. (The preserved Britannia Bridge section shows that both top and bottom flanges were of cellular construction, but (according to Fairbairn) the cellular construction of the bottom flange was adopted, not because of the nature of the forces it had to withstand,  but because of their magnitude and the consequent "practical difficulties which would have been encountered, had it been attempted to achieve the requisite sectional area in a solid mass") 

In some ways this isn't a "cellular girder" as such (compared to a spaceframe or geodesic construction) as the cells don't share loads from the entire girder, but merely act to stiffen one plate in isolation. Design of such complex integrated structures requires mathematical modelling techniques in advance of Fairbairn's day.

In bridges 

Fairbairn's theoretical girder appeared at just the right time for the increasing demand for long railway bridges. Robert Stephenson engaged both him and Hodgkinson as consultants to assist with his Britannia and Conwy bridges, both of which contained the railway track within a large tubular girder. Shortly afterwards Brunel also chose to use a pair of small diameter round girders as part of a larger truss at Chepstow. However, although many of the longest-span railway bridges in use in the 1860s used tubular or box girders Benjamin Baker in his Long-Span Railway Bridges was already dismissing the 'box girder with web plates' as 'the most unfavourable type for long-span railway bridges which it will be necessary for us to investigate'.  The Coronado Bay Bridge has the tallest box girder.

Box girder bridges of shallow rectangular cross-section and aerofoil characteristics became extensively used in road bridges from the 1960s onwards, such as the Severn Bridge, being much lighter than the deeper truss-type girder construction used on previous bridges such as the Golden Gate Bridge.

Safety concerns over box girder bridges 
In the early 1970s, a number of box girder bridges collapsed during construction: the Cleddau Bridge in Wales, West Gate Bridge in Australia and the Koblenz Bridge in Germany. That led to serious concerns over the continued use of box girders and extensive studies of their safety, which involved an early use of computer modelling, and was a spur to the development of finite element analysis in civil engineering.

See also 
 Hollow structural section
 Structural steel

Bridges 
 Tubular bridges
 Britannia Bridge
 Conwy Railway Bridge
 Box girder bridges
 Severn Bridge
 Cleddau Bridge
 West Gate Bridge
 Koblenz Bridge
 Gateway Bridge, Brisbane, Queensland, Australia

References 

Girders

sv:Lådbalk
Scottish inventions